Lohum Jo Daro (Sindhi:لوهم جو دڙو, Urdu:لوہم جو دڑو) is most ancient archaeological site which is situated close to  Piaro Goth railway station previous Larkana now Dadu District , Sindh, Pakistan. It is near to the bank of Indus River. The site belongs to the late period of Indus Valley civilization like Jhukar-Jo-Daro , Chanhudaro and others. This site was excavated by  N. G. Majumdar during the excavations in Sindh  in 1930s. The terracotta bull figurine was discovered from lohum Jo Daro. The findings were examined at the site proves that the flow of Indus River was closed to Lohum Jo Daro in Chalcolithic period.

References 

History of Sindh
Archaeological sites in Sindh
Ruins in Pakistan
Dadu District